James Alton Bragan (March 12, 1929 – June 2, 2001) was an infielder, manager and league president in American minor league baseball, a scout and coach at the Major League level, and a college baseball coach during a 40-plus year career in the game. He was the brother of MLB catcher, shortstop, manager and coach Bobby Bragan, also a minor league president.

Born in Birmingham, Alabama, Jimmy Bragan attended Mississippi State University and signed with the Brooklyn Dodgers in 1950.  When his eight-year playing career ended, he became the manager of the Class D Bluefield Dodgers in 1957 and then joined the Cincinnati Reds organization as a scout. He remained a scout with the Reds through 1966 and then joined the major league club as first base coach from 1967–69 on the staff of Dave Bristol.

Bragan moved to the Montreal Expos in 1970, where he was first base coach through early 1971, and third base coach in 1972. He also was manager of the Expos' Triple-A Winnipeg Whips for the latter half of 1971, head baseball coach of Mississippi State University in 1975, and a coach with the Milwaukee Brewers in 1976–77. He was president of the Double-A Southern League from 1981–94, one of the most successful periods in that league's history.  The league subsequently created the  Jimmy Bragan Executive of the Year Award in his honor. In 1994 he was presented with the King of Baseball award given by Minor League Baseball.

Bragan died in Westover, Alabama, in 2001 at the age of 72.

Baseball coaching record

References

External links

1929 births
2001 deaths
Baseball players from Birmingham, Alabama
Chattanooga Lookouts managers
Cincinnati Reds coaches
Cincinnati Reds scouts
Cleveland Indians scouts
Columbia Reds players
Elmira Pioneers players
Fort Worth Cats players
Macon Dodgers players
Major League Baseball first base coaches
Major League Baseball third base coaches
Miami Sun Sox players
Milwaukee Brewers coaches
Minor league baseball executives
Mississippi State Bulldogs baseball coaches
Mississippi State Bulldogs baseball players
Mobile Bears players
Montreal Expos coaches
Montreal Expos scouts
Nashville Vols players
Newport News Dodgers players
Savannah Redlegs players